The Valencia Assembly is a Ford Motor Company automobile factory in Valencia, Venezuela, opened in 1962, and spanning . The plant employed about 900 as of December 2018 before Ford offered buyouts to all employees.

On 5 May 2014, Ford of Venezuela said temporary cessation, because they were affected by shortages. A situation that has continued into both 2015 and 2016. In 2017 and 2018, several hundred vehicles were produced. The plant assembled Ford Explorer and Ford Fiesta as of 2018.

Former products
Ford Bronco  
Ford Mustang
Ford Cargo 
Ford Corcel
Ford EcoSport 
Ford Explorer Sport Trac 
Ford Festiva
Ford Focus 
Ford F-Series 
Ford Fiesta 
Ford Ka 
Ford Laser
Ford Ranger
Ford Sierra
Ford Zephyr
Ford Explorer (1990–2019)

See also
 List of Ford factories

References

Ford factories
Manufacturing companies of Venezuela
Motor vehicle assembly plants